Gyeran-mari, Dalgyal-mari or rolled omelette in Korean cuisine is a savory banchan (side dish) made with beaten eggs mixed with several finely diced ingredients. Common ingredients include vegetables (onion, carrot, Korean zucchini, scallions, garlic chives), mushroom, processed meat (ham, bacon, imitation crab meat, canned tuna), salt or salted seafood (salted pollock roe, salted shrimp), and cheese. Optionally, gim (seaweed) is folded with the omelette. When served, the omelette is cut into  slices. It is also a common anju found at pojangmacha (street stalls).

Gallery

See also 
 Egg roll
 Omelette
 Tamagoyaki
 List of egg dishes

References 

Banchan
Egg dishes
Omelettes